KEZF may refer to:

 KEZF (FM), a radio station (88.7 FM) licensed to serve Grants, New Mexico, United States
 KVAM (FM), a radio station (88.1 FM) licensed to serve Cheyenne, Wyoming, United States, which held the call sign KEZF from February to June 2020
 KAIX, a radio station (88.3 FM) licensed to serve Casper, Wyoming, United States, which held the call sign KEZF from 2019 to 2020
 KJJC (AM), a radio station (1230 AM) licensed to serve Murray, Utah, United States, which held the call sign KEZF from 2018 to 2019
 KYWY (FM), a radio station (95.5 FM) licensed to serve Pine Bluffs, Wyoming, which held the call sign KEZF from 2014 to 2018
 KVXO, a radio station (88.3 FM) licensed to serve Fort Collins, Colorado, United States, which held the call sign KEZF in 2014
 KIHI, a radio station (88.9 FM) licensed to serve Burns, Wyoming, which held the call sign KEZF from 2009 to 2012
 the ICAO code for Shannon Airport near Fredericksburg, Virginia